In Greek mythology, Phylacus (Ancient Greek: Φύλακος means "guardian") was the name of the following figures:

 Phylacus, founder of the city of Phylace, Thessaly. He was the son of Deioneus and Diomede, husband of Clymene (Periclymene), and the father of Iphiclus, Alcimede, Evadne and possibly Clymenus.  In some accounts, Phylacus was also called the father of Alcimache who became the mother of Ajax the Lesser to Oileus. His children and grandchildren are sometimes referred to by the patronymic Phylacides. His grandson through Iphiclus was also named Phylacus. In some accounts, his grandsons Protesilaus and Podarces were called his sons by Astyoche.
 Phylacus, a Trojan who was killed by Leitus.
Phylacus, a hero who had a sanctuary in Delphi. He was one of the four heroes whose ghosts terrified the Gaulish troops that attacked Delphi.

Notes

References 

 Apollodorus, The Library with an English Translation by Sir James George Frazer, F.B.A., F.R.S. in 2 Volumes, Cambridge, MA, Harvard University Press; London, William Heinemann Ltd. 1921. . Online version at the Perseus Digital Library. Greek text available from the same website.
Apollonius Rhodius, Argonautica translated by Robert Cooper Seaton (1853-1915), R. C. Loeb Classical Library Volume 001. London, William Heinemann Ltd, 1912. Online version at the Topos Text Project.
 Apollonius Rhodius, Argonautica. George W. Mooney. London. Longmans, Green. 1912. Greek text available at the Perseus Digital Library.
 Gaius Julius Hyginus, Fabulae from The Myths of Hyginus translated and edited by Mary Grant. University of Kansas Publications in Humanistic Studies. Online version at the Topos Text Project.
 Homer, The Iliad with an English Translation by A.T. Murray, Ph.D. in two volumes. Cambridge, MA., Harvard University Press; London, William Heinemann, Ltd. 1924. Online version at the Perseus Digital Library.
 Homer, Homeri Opera in five volumes. Oxford, Oxford University Press. 1920. Greek text available at the Perseus Digital Library.
 Homer, The Odyssey with an English Translation by A.T. Murray, PH.D. in two volumes. Cambridge, MA., Harvard University Press; London, William Heinemann, Ltd. 1919. Online version at the Perseus Digital Library. Greek text available from the same website.
Pausanias, Description of Greece with an English Translation by W.H.S. Jones, Litt.D., and H.A. Ormerod, M.A., in 4 Volumes. Cambridge, MA, Harvard University Press; London, William Heinemann Ltd. 1918. . Online version at the Perseus Digital Library
Pausanias, Graeciae Descriptio. 3 vols. Leipzig, Teubner. 1903.  Greek text available at the Perseus Digital Library.
 Sextus Propertius, Elegies from Charm. Vincent Katz. trans. Los Angeles. Sun & Moon Press. 1995. Online version at the Perseus Digital Library. Latin text available at the same website.

Trojans
Thessalian characters in Greek mythology